Koutiala Cercle is an administrative subdivision of the Sikasso Region of southern Mali. The administrative center is the town of Koutiala. The Cercle is divided into 36 communes.

Economy
Koutiala is the heartland of the cotton production in Mali and its main town is sometimes called "the white gold capital" for its cotton. However, the industry has been affected by stagnation since the 1980s. Aside from cotton it is also noted for grain production, primarily pearl millet, sorghum and maize.

Administrative divisions
The Cercle of Koutiala is divided into 36 communes:

Diédougou
Diouradougou Kafo
Fagui
Fakolo
Gouadji Kao
Goudié Sougouna
Kafo Faboli
Kapala
Karagouana Mallé
Kolonigué
Konina
Koningué
Konséquéla
Koromo
Kouniana
Koutiala
Logouana
M'Pessoba
Miéna
N'Golonianasso
N'Goutjina
N'Tossoni
Nafanga
Nampé
Niantaga
Sincina
Sinkolo
Songo-Doubacoré
Songoua
Sorobasso
Tao
Yognogo
Zanfigué
Zangasso
Zanina
Zébala

References

Cercles of Mali
Sikasso Region